Vaa Kanna Vaa is a 1982 Indian Tamil-language film, directed by D. Yoganand and produced by Santhi Narayanasamy. The film stars Sivaji Ganesan, Sujatha, Major Sundarrajan and Jai Ganesh. It is a remake of the Telugu film Raa Kanna Raa. The film was released on 6 February 1982.

Plot 

Young lovers Ramu and Seetha fight all the time while old couple Naidu and Papa are devoted to one another. The young couople eventually rent a room at Naidu and Papa's house after Ramu defies his wealthy father to wed Seetha. The older couple starts to think of Seetha as their adopted daughter and is consequently drawn into the lives of the younger couple.

However, once Seetha has a child, problems erupt between Seetha and Ramu. Naidu and Papa support Seetha unconditionally becoming very attached to her child. Subsequently, Ramu rejoins with his father who relents wanting to see his grandson. He comes to accept Seetha as his daughter-in-law thereby taking away the child with her. This leaves Naidu losing his sanity and Papa heartbroken. They both die with Naidu committing suicide while Papa dies in shock at Naidu's death.

Cast 
Sivaji Ganesan as Naidu
Sujatha as Papa
Major Sundarrajan
Jai Ganesh as Ramu
Nagesh as Ezhumalai
Y. G. Mahendra as Krishnamoorthy
V. K. Ramasamy as Karnan
Vadivukkarasi as Seetha

Soundtrack 
The music was composed by M. S. Viswanathan with lyrics by Vaali.

Reception 
Kalki said the film was not to be analysed, but enjoyed.

References

External links 
 

1980s Tamil-language films
1982 films
Films directed by D. Yoganand
Films scored by M. S. Viswanathan
Tamil remakes of Telugu films